Ashe is a surname in Ireland. Most are of Norman origin and were originally known as d'Essecourt (their name has been Gaelicised as Ághas). A minority of the Ó Luaithre from County Galway also Anglicised their name as Ashe. The family crest is a silver shield with two black chevronels. Notable people with the surname include:

Aran Ashe, British erotic writer
Arthur Ashe (1943–1993), American tennis player and social activist
Bowman Foster Ashe (1885–1952), American academic administrator
Brian Ashe (born 1963), American politician
Corey Ashe (born 1986), American soccer player
Daniela Denby-Ashe (born 1978), British actress
Danni Ashe (born 1968), American model and businesswoman
Douglas Ashe, pseudonym used by John Franklin Bardin (1916–1981)
Geoffrey Ashe (born 1923), British writer on Arthurian subjects
George Ashe (disambiguation), multiple people
John Ashe (disambiguation), multiple people
Robert Ashe, multiple people
Samuel Ashe (disambiguation), multiple people
Thomas Ashe (1885–1917), Irish Republican
Thomas Ashe (1836–1889), British poet
Thomas Samuel Ashe (1812–1887), American politician
Victor Ashe (born 1945), American mayor and ambassador
William Shepperd Ashe (1814–1862), American politician

Given name
Ashe Olson Meyers (born 2016), son of Seth Meyers and Alexi Ashe
Ashe (singer), female singer-songwriter from California

Fictional characters

Given Name
Ashe, the Frost Archer, a playable character from the live-action online game League of Legends
Ashe, a character in the video game Final Fantasy XII
Ashe, a character from the fantasy-romance novels The Symphony of Ages by Elizabeth Haydon
Ashe Foreth rem ir Osboth (also spelled Osborth), a character in the novel The Left Hand of Darkness
Ashe Ubert, a character from the video games Fire Emblem: Three Houses and Fire Emblem Warriors: Three Hopes

Surname
Elizabeth Caledonia "Calamity" Ashe, a character in the video game Overwatch

References

English-language unisex given names